Events from the year 2006 in Sweden

Incumbents
 Monarch – Carl XVI Gustaf
 Prime Minister – Göran Persson, Fredrik Reinfeldt

Events
Love and War, an animated short film is released.
 Swegon Air Academy is founded.

Publications
 The Girl Who Played with Fire, novel by Stieg Larsson.
 26 October - The Swedish Metapedia was founded by Anders Lagerström.

Deaths

 20 January
Sven Fagerberg, writer (born 1918)
Dave Lepard, singer-songwriter and guitarist (b. 1980)
 5 July – Gert Fredriksson, canoer, Olympic champion (born 1919).
 27 July – Göran Printz-Påhlson, writer (born 1931)
 17 September – Hans Berglund, canoer (born 1918).
 4 October – Gunnar Åkerlund, canoer (born 1923).

See also
 2006 in Swedish television

References

 
2000s in Sweden
Years of the 21st century in Sweden
Sweden
Sweden